The 2007–08 Hartford Hawks women's basketball team represented the University of Hartford during the 2007–08 NCAA Division I women's basketball season. The hawks were led by ninth year head coach Jen Rizzotti. This was the second time in school history that the team advanced to the second round of the NCAA tournament.

Roster

Schedule

|-
!colspan=9 style=| Non-conference regular season

|-
!colspan=9 style=| NCAA Women's Tournament

References

Hartford Hawks women's basketball seasons
Hartford